Mercersburg is a borough in Franklin County, located near the southern border of Pennsylvania, United States.

Due to its location in a rural area, it had a relatively large percentage of African-American workers who had been enslaved from the Revolution. It was called "Black Town" in the early nineteenth century before incorporation under its current name. Refugee African Americans escaping from slavery in the South also settled here, and the area was known as "Little Africa".

History
Mercersburg was platted in 1780. The borough was named after Hugh Mercer, a general and hero in the American Revolutionary War. A post office has been in operation at Mercersburg since 1812.

Located near the southern border of Pennsylvania, the rural community became a place of refuge during the antebellum years for escaped African Americans who had been enslaved in the South. Some came to the area via the Underground Railroad. After the American Revolution, Pennsylvania had abolished slavery. In this area were communities of free African Americans who had worked in agriculture. It was relatively easy for refugees to join their communities after passing over the border of Maryland. 

This settlement was called "Black Town" in early years, before being incorporated in 1831Mercersburg. The rural area outside of town was referred to by locals as "Little Africa" because of its relatively large concentration of African Americans in this time period. Some were refugees who had settled here after escaping from slavery in the South. 

In later years, blacks moved away from here as they were at risk from slavecatchers, especially after passage of the Fugitive Slave Act in 1850, which had more stringent rules against free states. Many blacks moved to Philadelphia, which had a large free black community and helped new arrivals get settled; it also had more opportunities for jobs. 

In 2010 the population of Mercersburg was 6.49 percent African American, a total of 1,561 persons.

The Mercersburg Historic District, Lane House, and Mercersburg Academy are listed on the National Register of Historic Places.

Geography
Mercersburg is located in southwestern Franklin County at  (39.829388, -77.901952).

Mercersburg is located at the eastern foot of Cove Mountain on the west side of the Great Appalachian Valley.

Pennsylvania state highways 16, 75, and 416 all pass through Mercersburg. PA 75 leads north  to Fort Loudon and south  to the Maryland border. PA 416 leads northeast  to U.S. Route 30 near St. Thomas and southeast  to the Maryland border.

Demographics

As of the census of 2000, there were 1,540 people, 686 households, and 439 families residing in the borough. The population density was 1,581.0 people per square mile (613.0/km²). There were 770 housing units at an average density of 790.5 per square mile (306.5/km²). The racial makeup of the borough was 92.08% White, 6.49% African American, 0.58% Asian, 0.52% from other races, and 0.32% from two or more races. Hispanic or Latino of any race were 1.36% of the population.

There were 686 households, out of which 30.8% had children under the age of 18 living with them, 48.8% were married couples living together, 11.2% had a female householder with no husband present, and 36.0% were non-families. 32.4% of all households were made up of individuals, and 14.7% had someone living alone who was 65 years of age or older. The average household size was 2.24 and the average family size was 2.80.

In the borough the population was spread out, with 23.6% under the age of 18, 6.5% from 18 to 24, 29.7% from 25 to 44, 22.7% from 45 to 64, and 17.4% who were 65 years of age or older. The median age was 39 years. For every 100 females there were 88.3 males. For every 100 females age 18 and over, there were 88.8 males.

The median income for a household in the borough was $32,619, and the median income for a family was $46,042. Males had a median income of $30,602 versus $23,000 for females. The per capita income for the borough was $18,934. About 7.2% of families and 8.6% of the population were below the poverty line, including 7.5% of those under age 18 and 10.2% of those age 65 or over.

Education

Tuscarora School District
The district is located within the borders of Franklin County in south-central Pennsylvania. It includes the borough of Mercersburg and Montgomery, Peters, St. Thomas and Warren townships. The school district primarily encompasses a rural agricultural area with a total population of approximately 17,000 people. 

The district consists of four K-5 elementary schools (Saint Thomas, Mountain View, Mercersburg, Montgomery), one grades 6-8 middle school (James Buchanan MS) and one grade 9-12 high school (James Buchanan High School). Tuscarora, the name of the mountain on the western boundary, was named for the Tuscarora Nation, an Iroquoian-speaking tribe. They had lived in this area for a period after migrating from the Carolinas about 1713 after disastrous warfare. They continued to migrate north to present-day New York, where about 1722 they declared their migration over. They were accepted as the sixth nation of the Iroquois League, or Haudenosaunee, the powerful confederacy of five nations that occupied much of the territory west of the Hudson River and into northern Pennsylvania. 

Colonists adopted the Lenape language term for Conococheague Creek, which flows through the district on its way from the Path Valley south to the Potomac River. The local Delaware people, properly known as Lenape, named it for "clear water".

Mercersburg Academy

Mercersburg Academy is an independent college preparatory school that was founded in 1893. It has produced several Rhodes scholars, three Medal of Honor recipients, a Nobel laureate, two Academy Award winners, and 54 Olympians (including 12 gold medalists). Its campus, located east of the square in downtown Mercersburg, spans . It has 430 students (grades 9-12) from 26 states and 40 nations.

Marshall College
Marshall College was founded in Mercersburg in 1836. It later merged with Franklin College, in Lancaster County. It is known for the Mercersburg Theology of the Presbyterian Church.

Notable people

 James Buchanan, 15th President of the United States  
 Jimmy Curran, athlete and coach who trained five Olympic champions
 James Findlay, former mayor of Cincinnati and U.S. Congressman
 John Findlay, former U.S. Congressman
 William Findlay, former Pennsylvania governor and U.S. Senator
 Henry Harbaugh, Pennsylvania Dutch clergyman
 Harriet Lane, niece of James Buchanan
 James S. McCullough, former Illinois state auditor
 Thomas Bard McFarland, associate justice, Supreme Court of California
 Joseph Mitchell, Indiana Supreme Court justice, Goshen, Indiana mayor, and 2nd Indiana Cavalry Regiment captain during Civil War
 Blanche Nevin, sculptor 
 John Williamson Nevin, theologian
 Benicio del Toro actor and producer

Gallery

References

External links
 
 Mercersburg Area Chamber of Commerce
 Tuscarora School District
 Mercersburg Academy

Populated places established in 1780
Boroughs in Franklin County, Pennsylvania